= Malaysian choirs =

Malaysian choirs are choirs in Malaysia.

Although there are no professional choirs in Malaysia, there are a handful of state-backed semi-professional choirs and many active amateur choral groups throughout the country. Many choirs in Malaysia are linked to schools, tertiary educational institutions, churches and other religious institutions, performing arts groups or registered musical societies.

Many choirs normally share common singers, a phenomenon born out of the small pool of choral singers available to choirs in Malaysia. Many of the choirs with younger singers also have a tendency to focus only on choral competitions resulting in their repertoires becoming limited and very stale, with too much emphasis on costumes and choreography and neglecting choral programming, vocal quality and enunciation.

Malaysian choirs suffer from a perpetual problem of obtaining good choral venues as most of the secular performance halls are not properly designed for acoustics and are expensive to rent. Further, some of the best venues are to be found in churches but unlike in Europe or the Americas, churches in Malaysia on the whole forbid choral performances which are not an integral part of the worship service and usually only choirs drawn from those churches are permitted to sing. Only a handful of secular choirs have the luxury of having their own dedicated performance venues.
